Chris Tillett (born 25 February 1954) is an Australian sailor. He competed in the 470 event at the 1984 Summer Olympics.

References

External links
 

1954 births
Living people
Australian male sailors (sport)
Olympic sailors of Australia
Sailors at the 1984 Summer Olympics – 470
Place of birth missing (living people)
20th-century Australian people